Bevan Holmes (born 7 April 1946) is a former New Zealand rugby union player. A number 8 and flanker, Bevan represented North Auckland at a provincial level, and was a member of the New Zealand national side, the All Blacks, from 1970 to 1973. He holds the dubious distinction of making the most appearances for the All Blacks, namely 31, without playing in an international.

References

1946 births
Living people
Rugby union players from Christchurch
People educated at Northland College, Kaikohe
New Zealand rugby union players
New Zealand international rugby union players
Northland rugby union players
Rugby union number eights
Rugby union flankers